Samira Makhmalbaf (Samira Makhmalbaaf) (born 15 February 1980) is an Iranian filmmaker and screenwriter. She is the daughter of Mohsen Makhmalbaf, the film director and writer. Samira Makhmalbaf is considered to be part of the Iranian New Wave.

Early life 
Samira Makhmalbaf was born 15 February 1980 in Tehran to filmmaker Mohsen Makhmalbaf. As a child, she joined her father on his film sets and watched him edit afterwards. In her official biography, Makhmalbaf stated that her first taste for cinema came as a 7 year old, when she played a role in her father's film The Cyclist in 1987. Makhmalbaf left high school when she was 14 years old to study cinema in the Makhmalbaf Film House for five years. At the age of 20, she studied Psychology and Law at Roehampton University in London.

Career 
At the age of 17, after directing two video productions Makhmalbaf went on to direct her first feature film, La Pomme (The Apple). She presented La Pomme at Cannes Film Festival. In an interview at the London Film Festival in 1998, Samira Makhmalbaf stated that she felt that The Apple owed its existence to the new circumstances and changed atmosphere that prevailed in Iran as a result of the Khatami presidency. The Apple was invited to more than 100 international film festivals in a period of two years, while going to the screen in more than 30 countries. In 2000 she was a member of the jury at the 22nd Moscow International Film Festival.

Samira Makhmalbaf has been the winner and nominee of numerous awards. She was nominated twice for Golden Palm of Cannes Film Festival for Takhté siah (Blackboards) (2001) and Panj é asr (At Five in the Afternoon) (2003). She won Prix du Jury of Cannes, for both films in 2001 and 2003 respectively. Samira Mohmalbaf also won the Sutherland Trophy at the London Film Festival for The Apple in 1998 and the UNESCO Award at the Venice Film Festival in 2002 for 11'09"01 September 11. In 2003, a panel of critics at the British newspaper The Guardian named Makhmalbaf among the best 40 best directors at work today.

During the production of Asbe du-pa (Two Legged Horse), Makhmalbaf along with her cast and crew suffered an attack while filming in Afghanistan. Production came to a halt when a man who infiltrated the set as an extra tossed a hand grenade from the rooftop of a local bazaar. The attack severely injured six cast members and killed a horse. In an interview Makhmalbaf stated, "I saw little boys falling to the ground and the whole street was full of blood... My first thought was that I wouldn't see my father anymore." Determined to carry on, Makhmalbaf completed her film and held the initial release in 2008 in France.

After the completion of Asbe du-pa, Makhmalbaf earned nominations at various international film festivals. Ultimately winning awards at Ghent International Film Festival, San Sebastián International Film Festival, and Tallinn Black Nights Film Festival.

Style and themes 
Makhmalbaf's films followed applied the doc-fiction hybrid aesthetic of her father's earlier work. Employing non-professional actors and a street-level realism. Her films have been known to follow a theme of progress and change. Makhmalbaf's films have been known to follow a theme of progress and change. As reflected in her style, she strives to portray political real-world purpose, fully committed to exposing issues such as poverty. Also tackling topics such as women's rights and education in her 2003 film, Panj é asr (At Five in The Afternoon). Centering around a young woman in Afghanistan who sets out to pursue a more open minded education at a non-religious school.

In an interview with Indiewire she is asked about the relationship between metaphor and reality in her film Blackboards. She says, "The first image of the film starts with a very surreal image, but as you go into the film, you can feel the reality of being a fugitive. And I love this image very much and I think it can carry different meanings. It can express social, philosophic, and poetical meaning -- so many metaphors, and yet also, you can go into their reality. The idea for the film came out of my father's mind when I was looking for a subject to do for my next film. He gave me three or four pages and then it was time for me to imagine it. But I couldn't simply imagine it. How can I sit here in Cannes and think of people living in Kurdistan? So I had to go in it and be involved in it. So I cast the actors and found my locations, and at the same time, I let the reality of the situation come in. I don't want to kill the subject and put it in front of the camera and just shoot it as a dead subject. I let the reality come into imagination. I believe that metaphors are born from the imagination of the artist and the reality of life making love to each other. An example: Imagine more than a hundred old men want to go back to their country. This is imagination and reality. It's reality because there are some older generations that want to go back to their country to die. This is real. But just being old men is imagination. Or just being one woman is imagination. Or carrying these white boards is a combination of reality and imagination. Because maybe it's possible, if you're a refugee, if you're a teacher, what can you do except carry your blackboard and look for students? They are like street vendors, shouting, "Come, try to learn something!" In such a dire situation, everyone is poor, so nobody can learn anything. It is imagination, but it could exist."

Personal life 
Mohsen Makhmalbaf married Fatemeh Meshkini, who gave birth to their three children – Samira (or Zeynab, born in 1980), Meysam (or Ayyoub, born in 1981), and Hana (or Khatereh, born in 1988).
Mohsen Makhmalbaf says in an interview, "When I left the political organizations and moved into radio, Fatemeh came with me. I wrote programming and she became an announcer. When Samira was born, we'd take her with us to the radio station. We worked and she was always with one of us." Fatemeh Meshkini died in an accident in 1982. Mohsen Makhmalbaf subsequently married Fatemeh Meshkini's sister, Marziyeh Meshkini.

Samira Makhmalbaf has been a great activist for women's rights almost all her life. In an interview with The Guardian she says, "We have a lot of limitations, from all the written and unwritten law. But, still, I hope and I believe that it will get better. It has started with the democracy movement. But some things don't happen consciously. I wanted to make films, I made films to say something else, but in a way I became a kind of example. It was breaking some kind of cliche. Another new way of thinking started. Yes, we have a lot of limitations, but these limitations made a lot of strong, different kinds of women in Iran who, if they find a chance to express themselves, I'm sure have plenty of things to say. They may have found a deeper way through all these limitations." In the same interview she talks about politics and says, "Even if I made that kind of direct movie talking about politics, it's nothing. Nothing, because it's just talking like a journalist. You are saying something superficial. The movies I make are deeper. This kind of work can live more, longer, deeper, compared to that kind of journalistic work."

At Five in the Afternoon is the first feature film to be made in a post-Taliban environment. She talks about her film to the BBC, "I wanted to show reality, not the cliches on television saying that the US went to Afghanistan and rescued the people from the Taliban, that the US did a Rambo," said Makhmalbaf. "Though the Taliban have gone, their ideas are anchored in peoples' minds, in their traditions and culture, there is still a big difference between men and women in Afghanistan."

In an interview with the BBC she talks about the difficulties that women directors face in Iran. "Traditionally, it is in the minds of everybody that a woman cannot be a film maker. It is therefore very much harder for a woman. Also, when you live in this kind of situation there is a danger that you can start to develop a similar mind-set and so the thing is to challenge this situation, and then slowly the situation will change also in the minds of others. I very much hope that in the advent of freedom and democracy Iran can produce many more women directors."

Filmography

Awards and nominations 

 "Sutherland Trophy", London Film Festival (1998), UK.
 "Special Mention, Official Jury", Locarno Film Festival (1996), Switzerland.
 "Special mention, FIBRESCI jury", Locarno Film Festival (1998), Switzerland.
 "Jury's Special prize", Thessalonica Film Festival (1998), Greece.
 "Jury's Special prize", São Paulo Film Festival (1998), Brazil.
 "Jury's Special prize", Independent cinema Festival (1999), Argentina.
 "Critic's prize", Independent cinema Festival (1999).Argentina.
 "Audience's prize", Independent cinema Festival (1999).Argentina.
 "Jury Special award"Official Competition section of the 2000 Cannes Film Festival, France.
 "Federico Fellini Medal", UNESCO, Paris, (2000).
 "François Truffaut prize", Giffoni Film Festival in Italy (2000).
 "Giffoni's Mayor Prize ", Giffoni Film Festival, Italy, (2000).
 "Special cultural Prize", UNESCO, Paris, (2000).
 "The grand Jury prize", American Film Institute, U.S., (2000).
 "Jury Special award", Official Competition section of Cannes Film Festival 2003, France.
 Prize of the Ecumenical Jury, Cannes 2003, France.
 Golden Peacock, competition (first prize) for Best film at the 34th International Film Festival of India 2003, India.
 The "Youths' Cinema" Award in Singapore's 17th International Silver Screen Film Festival (2004).
Tallinn Black Nights Film Festival 2008.
 "The Special Jury Prize", San Sebastian Film Festival (2008).
Nuremberg International Human Rights Film Festival 2009.

References

Further reading 
 Persian cinema
 Women's cinema
 Iranian women
 List of famous Persian women
 Persian women's movement
Abecassis, Michaël. British Journal of Middle Eastern Studies 34, no. 3 (2007): 414-15.
Chamarette, Jenny. "The "New" Experimentalism?: Women In/And/On Film." In Feminisms: Diversity, Difference and Multiplicity in Contemporary Film Cultures, edited by Mulvey Laura and Rogers Anna Backman, 125-40. Amsterdam University Press, 2015.
Combs, Richard. "Film Comment." Film Comment, vol. 38, no. 5, 2002, pp. 74–76.
Johnson, William. Film Quarterly 53, no. 2 (1999): 47-49. doi:10.2307/1213721.
Merás, Lidia. "PROFESSION: DOCUMENTARIST: UNDERGROUND DOCUMENTARY MAKING IN IRAN." In Female Agency and Documentary Strategies: Subjectivities, Identity and Activism, edited by Ulfsdotter Boel and Rogers Anna Backman, 170-83. Edinburgh: Edinburgh University Press, 2018.

External links 
 http://www.makhmalbaf.com – Official homepage of the Makhmalbaf family of film-makers
 
http://www.makhmalbaf.com/?q=samira

Iranian women film directors
Iranian film directors
Iranian screenwriters
Persian-language film directors
Fellini Gold Medalists
1980 births
Living people